The British International School Abu Dhabi is an international school in Abu Dhabi, United Arab Emirates. Abu Dhabi Education council (ADEC) has rated BIS Abu Dhabi as a Band A, Very Good High Performing School. The school was established in September 2009 and currently has over 1700 students from over 70 different nationalities.

The British International School, Abu Dhabi is part of the Nord Anglia Education Group. The International Schools division of Nord Anglia Education provides British education for children between the ages of 2 and 18 years old in 55 international schools with over 50,000 students. Nord Anglia International School Dubai is a sister school, located some 130 km away in the city of Dubai, UAE.

The school offers education of the English National Curriculum for students from FS1 - Year 11, and the IB Diploma Programme for Year 12 and Year 13.

References

External links

 The British International School, Abu Dhabi website

2009 establishments in the United Arab Emirates
British international schools in the United Arab Emirates
International schools in Abu Dhabi
Educational institutions established in 2009
Private schools in the United Arab Emirates
Nord Anglia Education